Ishwarbhai Ramanbhai Parmar is an Indian politician and current Cabinet Minister of Social Justice and Empowerment of the Government of Gujarat. He is a member to the Gujarat Legislative Assembly from Bardoli in Surat district.

References

State cabinet ministers of Gujarat
People from Surat district
1971 births
Living people
Gujarat MLAs 2012–2017
Bharatiya Janata Party politicians from Gujarat
Gujarat MLAs 2017–2022
Gujarati people